Jason Charles Gallion (born February 10, 1977) is a Republican member of the Maryland Senate from the 35th district in Cecil County and Harford County.

Early life and career
Gallion was born in Havre de Grace, Maryland on February 10, 1977, where he graduated from Havre de Grace High School in 1995. He grew up helping his father, who worked for the State Highway Administration, raise beef cattle at home. He also worked as a teen at the dairy farms owned by his uncle, Nolan Gallion Sr., and the Hopkins family. He attended Harford Community College, where he earned a A.A. degree in political science in 1997. After graduating, he became a farmer, producing dairy from 1999 to 2004 and beef cattle and hay from 2004 onward.

Gallion got his first glimpse of politics at 13 years old, when he volunteered for Barry Glassman's first council race in Harford County. In 2016, he joined Glassman's administration as a part-time agricultural specialist in the Harford County Department of Governmental and Community Relations. Gallion also serves on the county's Economic Development Agricultural Advisory Board and is the liaison from the county's executive office to the Harford County Farm Bureau.

In 2006, Gallion unsuccessfully ran for the Harford County Council in District D, finishing second to Chad Shrodes in the Republican primary.

In 2007, Gallion applied to succeed delegate Barry Glassman, who had been appointed by Governor Martin O'Malley to the Maryland Senate following the resignation of senator J. Robert Hooper, in the Maryland House of Delegates. The Harford County Republican Central Committee voted unanimously to appoint attorney Howard Wayne Norman, Jr. to the House of Delegates. In 2010, Gallion ran an unsuccessful campaign for District 35A of the Maryland House of Delegates, running on a ticket alongside Dave Tritt and seeking to unseat Norman.

In 2011, Gallion served on the Harford County Council Redistricting Commission.

In 2014, Gallion again ran for the Maryland House of Delegates in District 35B, seeking to succeed retiring delegate Donna Stifler and delegate Wayne Norman, who sought election to the Maryland Senate. During the primary, he received the endorsement of the Maryland Farm Bureau PAC, the National Rifle Association, and the Cecil County Republican Club. He finished third in the three-way Republican primary, winning the majority of Cecil County.

In March 2018, following the unexpected passing of senator Wayne Norman, the Harford County Republican Central Committee tapped Gallion to succeed Norman on the primary election ballot. while Linda Norman, the late senator's wife, filled the remainder of his term in the Maryland Senate. In the months following his nomination, the central committee considered some political maneuvering that would allow delegate Teresa Reilly to run for state senate instead of re-election to the House of Delegates. Days before the Cecil County committee was scheduled to discuss supporting ballot realignment if both candidates declined the nomination, Gallion sent a letter to local GOP leaders that declared his intent to stay in the senate race. Consequentially, the Cecil County committee unanimously voted to table the possibility of ballot realignment. He defeated Independent candidate Frank Esposito and Libertarian Christopher Randers-Pehrson in the general election, receiving 67.6 percent of the vote.

In the legislature
Gallion was sworn into the Maryland Senate on January 9, 2019.

Committee assignments
 Member, Education, Health and Environmental Affairs Committee, 2019–present (environment subcommittee, 2019–present; health subcommittee, 2019–present)
 Joint Subcommittee on Program Open Space and Agricultural Land Preservation, 2019
 Joint COVID-19 Response Legislative Work Group, 2020–present

Political positions

Agriculture
The first bill that Gallion introduced in the Maryland Senate was a bill that would allow farm equipment to travel on highways within a 25-mile radius of a farm. He also introduced legislation that would ban the sale of plant-based beverages under the "milk" label under the pretext that eleven other southern states adopt similar legislation by 2029. Both bills passed and were signed by Governor Larry Hogan in April 2019.

Gallion introduced legislation during the 2020 legislative session that would ban the sale of foods made of animal tissues cultured from cells outside of the original animal, plants, and insects under the "meat" label. The bill received an unfavorable report by the Maryland Senate Finance Committee.

Drugs
Gallion, having lost a loved one to the opioid epidemic, says that he supports increased drug prevention in schools to prevent more people from turning to opioids.

Economy
In 2019, Gallion was the only senator to receive a score of 100 percent on the Maryland Free Enterprise Foundation's annual scorecard.

Education
During a debate on a multi-billion-dollar education reform plan in March 2020, Gallion introduced an amendment that would have reduced the number of teaching scholarships by $16 million and reduce the expansion of the state's Judy Center network of early education hubs by $12 million. The amendment was rejected in a party-line vote.

Gallion introduced legislation during the 2021 legislative session that would move appointing authority for the Harford County school board from the governor to the county executive, with input from the county council.

Elections
During a debate on legislation that would ban people from simultaneously running for elected public offices and political party offices and from holding both offices at the same time, Gallion proposed amending the bill to allow an individual to run for both offices at the same time so long as they can't simultaneously hold both offices.

Gallion introduced legislation alongside senators Justin Ready and Bryan Simonaire during the 2021 legislative session that would require voters to show some form of identification before casting a ballot. He also sponsored legislation that would require people that deliver mail-in ballots to be a family member or part of the immediate household of the voter and ban campaign volunteers or candidates from delivering mail-in ballots for another vote. Additionally, Gallion said that he would sponsor legislation that would increase penalties for voter fraud, including a four-year loss of voting rights.

In March 2021, Gallion opposed legislation that would expand the number of early voting centers in Maryland and permanently expand mail-in voting, worrying that the state might be putting an "extra burden" on local governments.

Environment
In October 2019, the Maryland League of Conservation Voters gave Gallion a score of 20 percent, the lowest score in the Maryland Senate and tying him with senator Jack Bailey.

During debate on an omnibus climate action bill (the Climate Solutions Now Act of 2021), Gallion introduced an amendment that would push back the bill's goal of achieving net-zero emissions by 2050 instead of 2045. He also worried that the bill's tree planting program would create habitat for deer in agricultural buffer zones.

Gallion said that he would rather have the issue of community solar versus commercial solar stay in the hands of each county instead of the Maryland Public Service Commission.

Guns
Gallion, who describes himself as a Second Amendment advocate, has said that he is "leery" about red flag gun laws because he does not want to restrict rights for law-abiding citizens.

Gallion introduced legislation during the 2019 legislative sessions that allows Harford County farmers to use rifles and shotguns to rid their properties of animals that damage crops. The bill passed and was signed by Governor Hogan on April 18, 2019.

During the 2021 legislative session, Gallion defended an amendment introduced by senator Jack Bailey that would exempt law enforcement officers, off-duty officers, or retired officers from legislation that prevents people from carrying guns in or near a polling place, arguing that having an armed law enforcement officer on hand could help quell a disturbance at a polling place if one arose.

Marijuana
Gallion opposes legalizing recreational marijuana, preferring to wait and see what comes from states like Colorado as test cases. However, he has expressed interest in looking into how farmers could get involved in industrial hemp for medicinal use.

Redistricting
In 2019, Gallion cosponsored legislation introduced by Governor Hogan that would create an independent redistricting commission to draw Maryland's congressional and legislative district maps.

Gallion intended on introducing an amendment to the state's legislative redistricting plan to stop the use of hybrid districts, replacing those districts with three single-member delegate subdistricts. However, the amendment was still being drafted on the day of the vote and the Maryland Senate rejected his request to delay the resolution.

Social issues
In 2014, Gallion signed a petition to overturn Maryland's "bathroom bill", which allows a person undergoing gender re-assignment surgery or a person with gender dysphoria, to use the restroom of their choice.

Electoral history

References

External links
 

Living people
1977 births
People from Havre de Grace, Maryland
Republican Party Maryland state senators
21st-century American politicians